Le Nouveau Détective is a French weekly magazine created in 1928 as Détective. The magazine is part of Hubert Burda Media. It deals with crime stories, trials reports and victims stories. There are also some jokes, sudokus, crosswords. The last pages are traditionally dedicated to animal life.

Le Nouveau Détective became through the years a cult magazine, owing to its special style. Stories are reported in a detailed and biased way. The graphic signature is also easily recognizable: bright colors, photoshop effects for a better suggestion of horror and catchy headlines.

References

External links
 Official website

1928 establishments in France
News magazines published in France
Weekly magazines published in France
Magazines established in 1928
True crime magazines